The Emirates of Ylaruam is an accessory for the Dungeons & Dragons fantasy role-playing game.

Contents
The Emirates of Ylaruam is a supplement which focuses on the nation of Ylaruam. The Emirates of Ylaruam features a detailed desert village.

Publication history
GAZ2 The Emirates of Ylaruam was written by Ken Rolston, with a cover by Clyde Caldwell, and was published by TSR in 1987 as a 64-page booklet with a large color map and an outer folder.

Reception
Lawrence Schick, in his 1991 book Heroic Worlds, calls The Emirates of Ylaruam a "Fine campaign setting".

Reviews

References

External links
 
 

Dungeons & Dragons Gazetteers
Mystara
Role-playing game supplements introduced in 1987